A general election was held in the U.S. state of Kansas on November 4, 2014. Primary elections were held on August 5.

Governor and Lieutenant Governor

Incumbent Republican Governor Sam Brownback and Lieutenant Governor Jeff Colyer successfully ran for re-election to a second term in office. They defeated Jennifer Winn and her running mate Robin Lais in the Republican primary.

Democrat Paul Davis, Minority Leader of the Kansas House of Representatives, ran unsuccessfully in the general election with running mate businesswoman Jill Docking.  Keen Umbehr appeared on the ballot as the Libertarian Party candidate along with running mate Josh Umbehr, a Wichita-based physician.

Attorney General
Incumbent Republican Attorney General Derek Schmidt ran successfully for re-election to a second term in office. He was opposed by Democrat A.J. Kotich.

General election

Polling

Results

Secretary of State
Incumbent Republican Secretary of State Kris Kobach ran successfully for re-election to a second term in office.

Republican primary
Kobach was opposed in the primary by Scott Morgan.

Endorsements

Polling

Results

General election
Former Republican State Senator Jean Schodorf was the Democratic nominee for the general election. She was defeated by Kobach.

Polling

Results

State Treasurer
Incumbent Republican State Treasurer Ron Estes was re-elected to a second term in office. He defeated Democrat Carmen Alldritt.

General election

Polling

Results

Commissioner of Insurance
Incumbent Republican Commissioner of Insurance Sandy Praeger is not running for re-election to a fourth term in office. She has endorsed the Democratic nominee, Dennis Anderson, saying that he is more "dedicated to good public policy and [will] not use the office for political gain." Anderson lost the election to Ken Selzer.

Republican primary
Beverly Gossage, David J. Powell, Ken Selzer, Clark Shultz and John M. Toplikar ran for the Republican nomination.<ref
name=list/>

Results

General election
Selzer defeated Democrat Dennis Anderson in the general election.

Polling

Results

United States Senate

Republican Senator Pat Roberts ran for re-election to a fourth term. Greg Orman is running as an independent. Shawnee County District Attorney Chad Taylor won the Democratic primary, but withdrew his candidacy on September 3. After a court challenge, on September 18, the Kansas Supreme Court ruled that his name would be taken off the ballot. Roberts was re-elected with about 53% of the vote, compared to Orman's 43%.

United States House of Representatives

Four U.S. Representatives from the state of Kansas were elected in 2014, one from each of the state's four congressional districts.

Kansas House of Representatives
Elections were held for all 125 seats in the Kansas House of Representatives.

References

 
Kansas